César David Menacho Flores (born October 14, 1964 in Santa Cruz de la Sierra) is a Bolivian sport shooter. At age forty-three, Menacho made his official debut for the 2008 Summer Olympics in Beijing, where he competed in men's trap shooting. He placed thirty-fourth out of thirty-five shooters in the two-day qualifying rounds, with a total hit of 106 targets. For being the oldest member of the team, Menacho became the nation's flag bearer at the opening ceremony.

References

External links
NBC Olympics Profile

Bolivian male sport shooters
Living people
Olympic shooters of Bolivia
Shooters at the 2008 Summer Olympics
Shooters at the 2011 Pan American Games
Pan American Games competitors for Bolivia
Sportspeople from Santa Cruz de la Sierra
1964 births
Shooters at the 2015 Pan American Games
Shooters at the 2019 Pan American Games